Nahziah Carter (born August 24, 1999) is an American basketball player. He played college basketball for the Washington Huskies.

Early life and high school career
Carter grew up in Rochester, New York and attended Bishop Kearney High School. He averaged 15.1 points per game as a junior. As a senior, Carter averaged 19.1 points, 3.0 rebounds and 1.6 assists per game. Rated a four-star recruit, Carter originally committed to play college basketball at Dayton but re-opened his recruitment after Archie Miller left to become the head coach at Indiana. Carter eventually committed to play at Washington over offers from Georgetown and Boston College.

College career
As a true freshman, Carter averaged 5.1 points and 1.7 rebounds per game. He averaged 8.1 points and 2.4 rebounds per game and scored at least ten points in 15 games as a key reserve in his sophomore season.

Carter entered his junior season as the Huskies' leading returning scorer. He scored a career-high 23 points with seven rebounds in the Huskies season opening win over 16th-ranked Baylor. Carter scored 18 points and grabbed 12 rebounds against Tennessee for his first career double-double in a 75–62 loss. He was the Huskies's third-leading scorer and rebounder as a junior with 12.2 points and 4.9 rebounds per game.

Carter was suspended from team activities on October 15, 2020, due to sexual assault allegations. On December 4, he announced he was leaving Washington to turn professional.

He is on the Atlanta Hawks roster for the 2021 NBA Summer League.

Career statistics

College

|-
| style="text-align:left;"| 2017–18
| style="text-align:left;"| Washington
| 34 || 2 || 14.2 || .469 || .409 || .618 || 1.7 || .5 || .8 || .4 || 5.1
|-
| style="text-align:left;"| 2018–19
| style="text-align:left;"| Washington
| 36|| 0 || 20.6 || .478 || .310 || .638 || 2.4 || .9 || .4 || .2 ||8.1
|-
| style="text-align:left;"| 2019–20
| style="text-align:left;"| Washington
| 32 || 31 || 31.0 || .433 || .366 || .617 || 4.9 || 1.5 || 1.4 || .8 || 12.2
|- class="sortbottom"
| style="text-align:center;" colspan="2"| Career
| 102 || 33 || 21.7 || .455 || .357 || .624 || 3.0 || 1.0 || .9 || .4 || 8.4

Personal life
Carter is the nephew of rapper Jay Z.

References

External links
Washington Huskies bio

1999 births
Living people
American men's basketball players
Basketball players from New York (state)
Small forwards
Washington Huskies men's basketball players
Sportspeople from Rochester, New York